Helen Elizabeth George (born 19 June 1984) is an English actress, best known for playing Trixie Franklin on the BBC drama series Call the Midwife. In 2015, she participated in the thirteenth series of BBC One's Strictly Come Dancing; she was paired with Aljaž Skorjanec, and finished in sixth place. She was nominated for the Grammy Award for Best Musical Theater Album at the 64th Annual Grammy Awards for her contribution to the cast recording of Cinderella.

Early life
George was born in Harborne, Birmingham, to political science professor Neil Thomas and social worker Margareth Thomas. She has a sister, Elizabeth, a veterinarian.
Raised in Winchester,  Hampshire, she attended Henry Beaufort School between 1995 and 2000, and studied ballet as a child, eventually becoming a junior associate at Birmingham Royal Ballet, and was active in sports, competing in the long jump. As a child she dreamed of being the first female manager of Aston Villa Football Club.

George decided that she wanted to work in musical theatre at the age of 15, when she saw a production of Les Misérables. She is a graduate of the Royal Academy of Music. George also attended Birmingham School of Acting.

Career
George attended the Royal Academy of Music, London, studying musical theatre. She gained her first role some two weeks after graduation in the play The Woman in White. She was a backing singer for Elton John during a tour. She sang at venues including Wembley Arena and the Royal Albert Hall.

George was cast in the role of Trixie on the BBC One series Call the Midwife, based on the book by Jennifer Worth. She was daunted by the prospect of working with the likes of Pam Ferris and Jenny Agutter. As part of the role she was trained in the medical techniques of the 1950s, including how to deliver a baby. In 2012, she underwent a press tour in the United States to promote the series there. She also starred in the music video for singer Birdy's cover of "1901".

In August 2015, George was announced as one of the celebrities who would compete in the thirteenth series of Strictly Come Dancing. She was partnered with professional dancer Aljaž Škorjanec. Despite continuously getting high remarks from the judges, George was eliminated in week 11, finishing in sixth place.

In May 2020, she sang "(There'll Be Bluebirds Over) The White Cliffs of Dover" at Buckingham Palace in a BBC broadcast marking the 75th anniversary of VE Day.

Personal life
From 2011 to 2015, George was married to actor Oliver Boot. In April 2016, she began dating her Call the Midwife co-star Jack Ashton when they went to South Africa to film the show's Christmas special. Their daughter, Wren Ivy, was born in September 2017. During her pregnancy with Wren, George was diagnosed with ICP. Due to this complication, she delivered Wren three weeks early via elective caesarean section. She is a patron of the charity ICP Support. In June 2021, George announced on Instagram that she was pregnant with her second child. Another daughter, Lark, was born in November 2021.

Filmography

References

External links

1984 births
21st-century British ballet dancers
21st-century British dancers
21st-century English singers
21st-century English women singers
Alumni of the Royal Academy of Music
Birmingham Royal Ballet dancers
English film actresses
English television actresses
English voice actresses
Living people
People from Harborne